The Wharepapa River is a river of the Wellington Region of New Zealand's North Island. It flows south from its sources within Remutaka Forest Park to reach the western end of Palliser Bay close to the small settlement of Wharekauhau.

See also
List of rivers of New Zealand

References

Rivers of the Wellington Region
Rivers of New Zealand